Matthew Paul Burnell has been the member of the Australian House of Representatives for the Division of Spence in South Australia since he was elected at the 2022 Australian federal election. He is a member of the Australian Labor Party.

Early life
Burnell grew up on his family's citrus farm near Mildura in Victoria. He joined the Army Reserves then worked as a truck driver and later seafarer. He became a union organiser in the Transport Workers' Union in 2016. He lives in Hillbank with his wife Cassandra.

References

Australian Labor Party members of the Parliament of Australia
Labor Right politicians
Living people
Members of the Australian House of Representatives
Members of the Australian House of Representatives for Spence
Australian trade unionists
21st-century Australian politicians
Year of birth missing (living people)